Myths of the Near Future Part Two is the third album by Mo Boma, released on July 26, 1995 through Extreme Records.

Track listing

Personnel 
Mo Boma
Jamshied Sharifi – synthesizer, percussion, engineering
Skúli Sverrisson – bass guitar, engineering
Carsten Tiedemann – electric guitar, EBow, lute, synthesizer, percussion, production, mixing, recording
Production and additional personnel
Silke – cover art

References

External links 
 

1995 albums
Extreme Records albums
Mo Boma albums